On Site Opera (OSO) is a professional opera company based in New York City that specializes in site-specific productions. The company was founded in 2012 by General and Artistic Director Eric Einhorn and Executive Director/Producer Jessica Kiger.  On Site Opera, a registered 501(c)(3) nonprofit organization, is member of Opera America and the New York Opera Alliance.

In addition to site-specific production, On Site Opera is committed to introduce young audiences to opera. On Site Opera has produced works such as Shostakovich's The Tale of the Silly Baby Mouse, Op. 56, at the Bronx Zoo in 2012 in order to expand how children encounter, understand, and engage with opera.

On Site Opera utilizes environmentally-friendly production technology in order to reduce its environmental impact. Through their partnership with CS Lighting, they use energy efficient, wireless LED SFK fixtures. 90% of all marketing materials are digital and recycled paper and ink are used for the other 10%.

In 2014, On Site Opera was the first opera company to explore how Google Glass can be used as a means to transmit subtitles. Figaro Systems created the software in which the translation of Rameau's Pigmalion was sent to Google Glass, allowing the opera-goer to experience opera and translation in their field of vision at the same time.

On Site Opera provides opportunities for emerging talent through an open audition call.

Production history 
2012: Dmitri Shostakovich's The Tale of the Silly Baby Mouse at the Bronx Zoo
2013: George Gershwin's Blue Monday at the Cotton Club at 626 W 125th Street in Harlem
2014: Jean-Philippe Rameau's Pigmalion at Madame Tussauds New York and the Lifestyle-Trimco mannequin showroom at 152 W 25th Street, Chelsea, Manhattan
2014: Frédéric Chaslin/P. H. Fisher's Clarimonde (based on "La Morte Amoureuse", developmental workshop) at St. Francis de Sales Catholic Church, Phoenicia, New York
2015: Giovanni Paisiello's Il barbiere di Siviglia (1782) at Edith Fabbri House (House of the Redeemer) at 7 East 95th Street, Upper East Side
2016: Marcos Portugal's The Marriage of Figaro at 632 Hudson Street (Manhattan)
2016: Dominick Argento's Miss Havisham’s Wedding Night and Hector Berlioz's La mort de Cléopâtre at the Harmonie Club, Manhattan
2016: World premiere of Gregg Kallor's The Tell-Tale Heart for The Crypt Sessions at the Church of the Intercession, Harlem
2017: Mozart's The Secret Gardener, partnered with Atlanta Opera (New York and Atlanta premiere), at West Side Community Garden, Upper West Side; and Atlanta Botanical Garden
2017: Darius Milhaud's La mère coupable (US premiere) at The Garage, 611 West 50th Street, Manhattan
2017: World premiere of Rhoda and the Fossil Hunt by John Musto (about the granddaughter of Charles R. Knight), partnered with Lyric Opera of Chicago and Pittsburgh Opera, at the American Museum of Natural History, Manhattan
2018: Morning Star by Ricky Ian Gordon (the opera's second production), at Eldridge Street Synagogue

References

External links

New York City opera companies
2012 establishments in New York City
Arts organizations established in 2012
Musical groups established in 2012